Ixeris stolonifera, commonly called creeping lettuce, is a species of flowering plant in the family Asteraceae. It is native to east Asia, where it is found in China, Japan, and Korea.  It is a common and widespread species in Japan. 

Its natural habitat is on open mountain slopes, often is rocky areas with shallow soil. However, it is also found in disturbed areas such as cultivated fields and abandoned ground. It has naturalized locally in the northeastern United States.

It produces yellow heads of flowers in spring. It can be confused with the similar-looking Ixeris japonica, but I. stolonifera is distinguished by its smaller inflorescences, smaller fruits, and more ovate-orbicular leaves.

References

External links
 

Cichorieae